Leah Remini: It's All Relative is an American reality television series starring Leah Remini. The series premiered on July 10, 2014, and airs on TLC. It follows Remini's day-to-day life as she takes on the roles of mother, wife, and friend.

In March 2015, TLC renewed the show for a second season. The 14-episode season began in July 2015. In 2016 Leah Remini announced on her social page that the show would not return for a third season. However, in September 2017, she revealed that she might be interested in doing another season.

Cast
 Leah Remini, an American actress and comedian
 Angelo Pagán, Leah's husband
 Sofia Pagán, Leah and Angelo's daughter
 Vicki Marshall, Leah's mother
 George Marshall, Leah's step-father
 Shannon Farrara, Leah's sister
 William, Leah's brother-in-law and Shannon's husband
 Trish, Sofia's nanny
 Lou, family friend/handyman/security
 Raffy, Leah's personal assistant

Episodes

Season 1 (2014)

Season 2 (2015)

Reception
Melissa Camacho of Common Sense Media gave the show 3 out of 5 stars.

References

External links
Official page

2010s American reality television series
2014 American television series debuts
2015 American television series endings
English-language television shows
Television shows set in Los Angeles
TLC (TV network) original programming